Grevillea kirkalocka is a species of flowering plant in the family Proteaceae and is endemic to inland Western Australia. It is a low, spreading shrub with divided leaves with sharply-pointed linear lobes and clusters of red flowers.

Description

Taxonomy
Grevillea kirkalocka was first formally described in 2002 by Peter M. Olde and Neil R. Marriott in the journal Nuytsia from specimens collected on Kirkalocka Station in 1995.
The specific epithet (kirkalocka) refers to the type location, and as a "mark of respect for the proprietors who have a progressive conservation ethic".

Distribution and habitat
This grevillea grows on sandheath and is only known from within  of the type location in the Murchison bioregion of inland Western Australia.

Conservation status
Grevillea kirkalocka is listed as "Priority One" by the Government of Western Australia Department of Biodiversity, Conservation and Attractions, meaning that it is known from only one or a few locations which are potentially at risk.

References

kirkalocka
Proteales of Australia
Flora of Western Australia
Plants described in 2002